The Night Of is a 2016 American eight-part crime drama television miniseries based on the first season of Criminal Justice, a 2008 British series. The miniseries was written by Richard Price and Steven Zaillian (based on the original Criminal Justice plot by Peter Moffat), and directed by Zaillian and James Marsh. Broadcast on HBO, The Night Of premiered on July 10, 2016 to critical acclaim. The first episode premiered on June 24, 2016, via HBO's on-demand services. The Night Of received 13 Emmy nominations, winning five, including Outstanding Lead Actor in a Limited Series for Riz Ahmed.

Cast

Starring
 John Turturro as John Stone, a lawyer who represents Nasir Khan
 Riz Ahmed as Nasir "Naz" Khan, a Pakistani-American college student accused of murdering a woman on the Upper West Side of New York City
 Michael K. Williams as Freddy Knight, an influential prisoner at Rikers Island
 Bill Camp as Detective Sergeant Dennis Box, the lead detective on Nasir's case
 Jeannie Berlin as Helen Weiss, a district attorney working on Nasir's case
 Payman Maadi as Salim Khan, Nasir's father
 Poorna Jagannathan as Safar Khan, Nasir's mother
 Glenne Headly as Alison Crowe, a lawyer who represents Nasir Khan
 Amara Karan as Chandra Kapoor, Alison's employee
 Ashley Thomas as Calvin Hart, a prisoner at Rikers Island
 Paul Sparks as Don Taylor, Andrea's stepfather
 Sofia Black-D'Elia as Andrea Cornish, the victim
 Afton Williamson as Wiggins, a police officer working at the 21st precinct 
 Ben Shenkman as Klein, a sergeant working at 21st precinct
 Chip Zien as Katz, a pathologist
 Paulo Costanzo as Ray Halle, financial adviser to Andrea and her mother
 Ned Eisenberg as Lawrence Felder, a judge
 Kirk "Sticky Fingaz" Jones as Walker, a prisoner at Rikers Island
 Glenn Fleshler as Judge Roth
 Mohammad Bakri as Tariq, a taxi driver and Salim's colleague
 Nabil Elouahabi as Yusuf, a taxi driver and Salim's colleague

Supporting
 Frank L. Ridley as Jerry
 Jeff Wincott as Lucas
 Fisher Stevens as Saul, John's pharmacist
 Lord Jamar as Tino
 Ariya Ghahramani as Amir Farik
 Syam Lafi as Hasan Khan
 Max Casella as Edgar
 J. D. Williams as Trevor Williams
 Frank Wood as Harry, the medical examiner
 Skipp Sudduth as Bell
 Kevin Dunn as Danny Lang
 Joe Egender as Cutler ("Cutty"), a drug dealer
 Mustafa Shakir as Victor

Production
On September 19, 2012, it was announced that HBO had ordered a pilot based on the British television series Criminal Justice. James Gandolfini was set to star, Richard Price would write the project, and Steven Zaillian would direct. On February 19, 2013, HBO passed on the project. However, on May 13, 2013, HBO reversed course, picking up Criminal Justice as a seven-part limited series. After Gandolfini's death on June 19, 2013, it was reported that the miniseries would move forward in his honor, and that Robert De Niro was set to replace Gandolfini. On April 21, 2014, John Turturro replaced De Niro because of scheduling conflicts. On March 11, 2016, it was announced that the project would premiere in the middle of 2016 under the title The Night Of. Gandolfini retains a posthumous executive producer credit.

In July 2016, Steven Zaillian commented about the possibility of a second season: "We're thinking about it and if we come up with something we all feel is worthy of doing, we'll do it. This was designed as a stand-alone piece. That being said, there are ways of certainly kind of taking what it feels like and what it's about and doing another season on another subject." In April 2017, Zaillian again commented on the possibility of a second season, saying: "Listen, we would love to do it, and when I say 'we,' I mean [co-creator] Richard Price and myself. If we can come up with something that we fall in love with, we'll do it. If we don't, we won't." In August 2017, John Turturro talked about the possibility of returning for season two: "We've been talking. So we'll see. I would be very interested because I felt that character offered something really rich. I'm hoping that that will come to fruition."

In January 2020, John Turturro stated that new episodes of The Night Of are still a possibility: "We have a couple of ideas but we have to sit down and discuss them, so we're at that stage so that's good."

Episodes

Reception

Critical reception
The Night Of received critical acclaim. On Metacritic, it has a weighted average score of 90 out of 100, indicating "universal acclaim" based on 40 reviews. It has a score of 94% on Rotten Tomatoes with an average rating of 8.6/10 based on 88 reviews; its consensus reads, "The Night Of is a richly crafted, exquisitely performed mystery that will keep viewers enthralled and leave them devastated."

IGN reviewer Jesse Schedeen gave the entire miniseries an 8.9 out of 10 "Great" score, writing, "With only a couple of exceptions, this summer hasn't been the greatest when it comes to new TV series, which makes The Night Ofs brief run all the more special. This limited series did little to shake up the formula when it (comes to) crime dramas, but it was distinguished by its amazing cast and the pervasive tension that drove the series from start to finish."

Accolades

Ratings
In the United States, TV ratings grew over the course of its eight-episode run, with daily ratings tripling between the premiere and season finale. The premiere episode drew 2.1million viewers, before increasing to an average gross audience of 8.2million viewers on HBO.

In the United Kingdom, where it aired in September 2016, the first episode drew 468,000 viewers on Sky Atlantic. The show eventually drew an audience of 2.5million viewers across Sky's On Demand platforms.

See also
 Serial (podcast), a series with several similarities

References

External links
 
 

2010s American crime drama television series
2010s American drama television miniseries
2016 American television series debuts
2016 American television series endings
American prison television series
American television series based on British television series
English-language television shows
Fictional portrayals of the New York City Police Department
HBO original programming
Primetime Emmy Award-winning television series
Television Academy Honors winners
Television series by BBC Studios
Television series by Home Box Office
Television series created by Richard Price (writer)
Television shows filmed in New York City
Television shows set in the Bronx
Television shows set in Queens
Works by Steven Zaillian